is a Japanese tarento, essayist, and radio personality represented by Oscar Promotion. She is a former TBS announcer from 1995 to 2010. She has two children. Her hobbies are wearing kimono, riding horses, and perform pilates.

Filmography

TV series

Radio series

As a TBS announcer

TV series

Radio series

Advertisements

References

External links
 
Keiko Kojima "Talk In Closet" 
 

Japanese entertainers
Japanese essayists
Japanese radio personalities
Japanese announcers
1972 births
Living people